Arm and hammer is a symbol of industry, and the god Vulcan.

Arm and hammer may also refer to:

 Arm & Hammer, brand of baking soda products
 Arm & Hammer Park, formerly Mercer County Waterfront Park, in Trenton, New Jersey, USA

See also 
 Armand Hammer (disambiguation)
 Hammer and sickle